Rowse is a surname, derived from the name of an ancestor, 'the son of Rose' and may refer to

 A. L. Rowse, British historian
Anne Rowse, retired New Zealand dancer
 Herbert James Rowse, British architect
 Michael Rowse, naturalised Chinese civil servant in Hong Kong
 Samuel W. Rowse, American artist

See also
 Prowse (disambiguation)
 Rouse (disambiguation)